Edward Henry Willis, Baron Willis (13 January 1914 – 22 December 1992) was an English playwright, novelist and screenwriter who was also politically active in support of the Labour Party. In 1941 he became the General Secretary of the Young Communist League, the youth branch of the Communist Party of Great Britain.

Early life and War service
Ted Willis was born in Tottenham, Middlesex, third child and second son of Alfred John Henry Willis (1882-1957), a bus washer who later became a bus driver, and Maria Harriet, née Meek. He recalled that when leaving school aged fourteen: "I had a two-second 'career interview' with my Headmaster. He asked me what I wished to do for the future and I told him that I intended to become a writer. His response was a cackle followed by the remark: 'You will never make a writer in a hundred years. You haven't got the imagination for it or the intelligence. Go away and learn a good trade.'"

Willis was elected Chairman of the Labour League of Youth as the candidate of the left in 1937. In 1939, along with much of the League of Youth leadership, he joined the Young Communist League. He was drama critic for the Daily Worker.

Willis enlisted in the Royal Fusiliers in 1939, subsequently serving in the Army Kinematograph Service. He often spoke at meetings during the Second World War in favour of opening a second front, in order to help the Red Army, which was bearing the brunt of the Nazi onslaught.

Writing career
His passion for drama first manifested in plays he wrote for the Unity Theatre, based in a former chapel near St Pancras, during the war. He was best known for writing the television series Dixon of Dock Green, based on the stories of Gordon Snashall, a local Chislehurst policeman with whom he was great friends; the series ran for more than twenty years. He was Chairman of the Writers' Guild of Great Britain from 1958 to 1964. Willis created several British television series such as Virgin of the Secret Service, Hunter's Walk, The Adventures of Black Beauty, Copper's End, Sergeant Cork and Mrs Thursday.

Along with Berkely Mather, Willis was responsible for a huge proportion of scriptwriting for British television drama in the 1950s.  He was listed in the Guinness Book of Records as the world's most prolific writer for television; he also wrote 34 stage plays and a number of feature films. In the 1970s he turned to novels, including a spy story, The Left-Handed Sleeper, and a wartime thriller The Lions of Judah.

Honours and awards
Announced on 23 December 1963 he was awarded a life peerage, which was created on 21 January 1964 with the title Baron Willis, of Chislehurst in the County of Kent, on a Labour Party nomination.

Willis was the subject of This Is Your Life in 1959 when he was surprised by Eamonn Andrews in the club at the BBC's Lime Grove Studios, in London's Shepherd's Bush.

Personal life
Willis married the London-based actress Audrey Hale in 1944 and they had a son and a daughter. He died of a heart attack at his home in Chislehurst, Kent in December 1992 aged 78, and was buried at Tottenham Cemetery.

Credits

Selected plays
Buster (1943)
 Doctor in the House (1957, from the novel by Richard Gordon)
Hot Summer Night (1958)
The Scent of Fear (1959)
 Woman in a Dressing Gown (1964)

Films
Holiday Camp (1947)
Good-Time Girl (1948)
A Boy, a Girl and a Bike (1949)
The Huggetts Abroad (1949)
The Blue Lamp (original treatment, 1950)
The Undefeated (1951, documentary about disabled war veterans)
A Story of Achievement (1951, documentary about the development of margarine)
The Wallet (US Blueprint for Danger, 1952)
Top of the Form (1953)
Trouble in Store (1953)
The Large Rope (US: The Long Rope, 1953)
Burnt Evidence (1954)
Up to His Neck (1954)
One Good Turn (1955)
It's Great to Be Young (1956)
Woman in a Dressing Gown (1957)
The Young and the Guilty (1958)
No Trees in the Street (1959)
Flame in the Streets (1961)
The Horsemasters (1961)
Bitter Harvest (1963)Our Miss Fred (1972)

Selected TVThe Pattern of Marriage (1953)Dixon of Dock Green (1955–1976)Hot Summer Night (Armchair Theatre) (1959)Tell It to the Marines (1959–1960)Taxi! (1963–1964)
 The Sullavan Brothers (1964–1965)Sergeant Cork (1963–1969)Mrs Thursday (1966–1967)The Adventures of Black Beauty (1972–1974)

Novels
 Whatever Happened to Tom Mix? (1970)
 Death May Surprise Us (1974)
 Westminster One (1975)
 The Churchill Commando (1977)
 The Left-Handed Sleeper (1977)
 The Naked Sun (1980)
 The Buckingham Palace Connection (1980)
 The Lions of Judah (1981)
 The Most Beautiful Girl In The World (1982)
 Spring at the Winged Horse (1985)
 Problem for Mother Christmas (1986)
 The Green Leaves of Summer (1989)
 The Bells of Autumn (1991)
 Plume of Feathers (1993)

References

External links

Bibliography

 

1914 births
1992 deaths
Military personnel from Middlesex
English male screenwriters
English television writers
Labour Party (UK) life peers
Communist Party of Great Britain members
Young Communist League of Britain members
20th-century English novelists
Royal Fusiliers soldiers
British Army personnel of World War II
People from Tottenham
British male television writers
20th-century English male writers
20th-century English screenwriters
Life peers created by Elizabeth II